Huey is a village in Clinton County, Illinois, in the United States. As of the 2020 census, the village population was 160.

Geography

Demographics

As of the 2020 census there were 160 people, 64 households, and 37 families residing in the village. The racial makeup of the village was 95.00% White, 1.88% African American, 0.63% from other races, and 2.50% from two or more races. No residents identified as Hispanic or Latino of any race.

There were 64 households, out of which 32.81% had children under the age of 18 living with them, 50.00% were married couples living together, 6.25% had a female householder with no husband present, and 42.19% were non-families. 9.38% of all households were made up of individuals, and 3.13% had someone living alone who was 65 years of age or older. The average household size was 2.49 and the average family size was 2.13.

The village's age distribution consisted of 16.2% under the age of 18, 2.2% from 18 to 24, 31.7% from 25 to 44, 30.1% from 45 to 64, and 19.9% who were 65 years of age or older. The median age was 45.0 years. For every 100 females, there were 86.3 males. For every 100 females age 18 and over, there were 100.0 males.

The median income for a household in the village was $31,500, and the median income for a family was $31,458. Males had a median income of $27,500 versus $26,429 for females. The per capita income for the village was $24,390. About 2.7% of families and 8.9% of the population were below the poverty line, including none of those under age 18 and 11.1% of those age 65 or over.

References

Villages in Clinton County, Illinois
Villages in Illinois